John Law (born November 17, 1958) is an American artist, culture-jammer, and a primary member of the Cacophony Society and a member of the Suicide Club. He is also a co-founder of Burning Man (a.k.a. Zone Trip #4, a.k.a. Black Rock City) which evolved out of the spirit of the Cacophony Society when a precursor solstice party was banned from San Francisco's Baker Beach and merged with another Cacophony event on the Black Rock desert in Nevada. Originally from Michigan, Law has lived in San Francisco, California since 1976.

Art projects 
Law has worked for many years as a commercial neon contractor. His neon artistic projects have included re-configuring the neon of a Camel cigarette billboard to say "Am I dead yet" as part of the Billboard Liberation Front, underwater neon art as part of Desert Siteworks at Trego Hot Springs in the Black Rock Desert, neon illumination of the man at Burning Man through 1996.  He has also been responsible for maintaining the neon of the Tribune Tower in Oakland, CA.

Law owns and maintains three of the 12
remaining Doggie Diner heads, which were located above the restaurants of a small fast food chain in San Francisco and Oakland.  The dog heads were featured in a 2003 movie called "Head Trip" that featured a cross-country trip with the Doggie Diner heads, ending in a show by Cyclecide at CBGB in New York City.

Urban exploration 
Law has participated in urban exploration for over three decades, starting with the Suicide Club (1977–1982).
He has climbed the Golden Gate Bridge many times and explored underground bunkers.

Cacophony Society 
John Law is one of the early members of the Cacophony Society, a Culture jamming group with open membership, inspired in part by his earlier participation in the Suicide Club, which was in turn influenced by dadaists and situationists. Cacophony Society began in San Francisco, California, but eventually spread to most major cities in the United States and some outside the US. Claims have been made that Cacophony Society no longer exists, although some chapters are still active.

In 2013 John Law, along with Kevin Evans and Carrie Galbraith, co-authored "Tales of the San Francisco Cacophony Society", a book published by Last Gasp documenting the San Francisco Cacophony Society.

Burning Man 

In 1990, a separate event was planned by Kevin Evans and John Law on the remote and largely unknown dry lake known as Black Rock Desert, about 110 miles north of Reno, Nevada. Evans conceived it as a dadaist temporary autonomous zone with sculpture to be burned and situationist performance art. He asked John Law, who also had experience on the dry lake and was a defining founder of Cacophony Society, to take on central organizing functions. In the Cacophony Society's newsletter, it was announced as Zone No. 4, A Bad Day at Black Rock (inspired by the 1955 film of the same name).

Meanwhile, the beach burn was interrupted by the park police for not having a permit. After striking a deal to raise the Man but not to burn it, event organizers disassembled the effigy and returned it to the vacant lot where it had been built. Shortly thereafter, the legs and torso of the Man were chain-sawed and the pieces removed when the lot was unexpectedly leased as a parking lot. The effigy was reconstructed, led by Dan Miller, Harvey's then-housemate of many years, just in time to take it to Zone Trip No. 4.

Michael Mikel, another active Cacophonist, realized that a group unfamiliar with the environment of the dry lake would be helped by knowledgeable persons to ensure they did not get lost in the deep dry lake and risk dehydration and death. He took the name Danger Ranger and created the Black Rock Rangers. Thus the seed of Black Rock City was germinated, as a fellowship, organized by Law and Mikel, based on Evans' idea, along with Harvey and James' symbolic man. 

The three most well-known founders and present partners in ownership of its name and trademark (Law, Michael Mikel, and Larry Harvey)
were known as "The Temple of the Three Guys".

Artistic contributions 
Law, a neon sculptor and artist, originated the concept and design of installing neon on the Man at Burning Man
, an act which at once created an invaluable navigation aid and an indelible, omnipresent symbol. At that time, Burning Man had no streets, street signs, fences, or any other artificially imposed boundaries, and it took place in the virtually featureless deep playa (on which it may be easy to lose one's bearings or misjudge distances and wind up stranded alone in the desert). The decision to implement neon into the Man may have added to the safety of the event.

The early years of the festival allowed driving throughout the city but eventually curbed the practice back to only art cars. The symbol of the Burning Man, which had been added to the desert event later and was not part of its initial inception, became more and more identified with the event, in part because with the addition of the neon it was always universally visible, becoming the single unchanging reference point psychologically as well as physically.

Founders' conflict 
The last year John Law attended Burning Man was in 1996 when his friend, Michael Furey died in a motorcycle crash

while setting up the event and a couple were run over in a tent by an inattentive driver attempting to get to the distant rave camp.
After Law and Larry Harvey had fierce disagreements about these incidents and other issues, he left in disgust proclaiming that the event should not continue.

In 2007, the three partners were engaged in a legal struggle over control of the name and symbol of Burning Man.
Law's response to this struggle was to take legal action to dissolve the controlling partnership and release the name and symbol into the public domain.
The final outcome was settled out of court in 2008
with Law's interest being bought out by the current organizers which also ended the "Temple of the Three Guys" partnership.

Publications 
 "The Space Between" (2009, Furnace Press).  Three short stories about bridges.
 "Tales of the San Francisco Cacophony Society" by Carrie Galbraith (author), John Law (author), Kevin Evans (editor) (2013, Last Gasp).

References

External links 
 
 John Law live at The Influencers 2013 1/6
 John Law live at The Influencers 2013 2/6
 John Law live at The Influencers 2013 3/6
 John Law live at The Influencers 2013 4/6
 John Law live at The Influencers 2013 5/6
 John Law live at The Influencers 2013 6/6
 Cacophony Society main website (includes links to local chapters)
 History of Black Rock City, perspective of Cacophony Society 
 History of Black Rock City, perspective of Burning Man Organization,(AKA BMorg)
 John Law speaks: Is Burning Man a Brand or a Movement?

Living people
Cacophony Society
Burning Man
Artists from San Francisco
1958 births